Sybille Verckist (16 December 1934 – 26 August 2013) was a Belgian freestyle swimmer. She competed in three events at the 1952 Summer Olympics.

References

External links
 

1934 births
2013 deaths
Belgian female freestyle swimmers
Olympic swimmers of Belgium
Swimmers at the 1952 Summer Olympics
Swimmers from Antwerp